Vladimír Vondráček (22 May 1949) is a Czech former cyclist. He competed in the individual road race and team time trial events at the 1976 Summer Olympics.

References

External links
 

1949 births
Living people
Czech male cyclists
Olympic cyclists of Czechoslovakia
Cyclists at the 1976 Summer Olympics
People from Znojmo
Sportspeople from the South Moravian Region